Kalikapur may refer to:

Kalikapur, India, a census town in Singhbhum district, Jharkhand, India
Kalikapur Barasat, a census town in South 24 Parganas district, West Bengal, India
Kalikapur, Sonarpur, a census town in South 24 Parganas, West Bengal, India

See also
Chata Kalikapur, a census town in South 24 Parganas, West Bengal, India